Florida Georgia Line is an American country music duo founded in 2010 by Tyler Hubbard of Georgia and Brian Kelley of Florida, both of whom are vocalists and songwriters. Their 2012 debut single "Cruise" broke two major sales records: it was downloaded over seven million times, making it the first country song ever to receive the Diamond certification, and it became the best-selling digital country song, with 24 weeks at number one, until it was surpassed in July 2017 by Sam Hunt's "Body Like a Back Road". "Cruise" helped to pioneer a style of country music known as "bro-country", which incorporates production elements from rock and hip-hop music, and tends to cover subject matter such as partying, drinking, driving trucks and sexual attraction. Much of their subsequent music has been tagged with the "bro-country" label as well.

Florida Georgia Line was formed in 2010 in Nashville, Tennessee, and began as a cover band. In December 2011, they signed to the Big Loud Mountain label. Their second EP, It'z Just What We Do, was released in 2012 and charted on the Billboard Top Country Albums chart. Several months later they signed with Republic Nashville, part of the Big Machine Label Group. They released their second album, Anything Goes on October 14, 2014. Their third album, Dig Your Roots, was released on August 26, 2016, and the fourth Can't Say I Ain't Country on February 15, 2019. Their fifth album, Life Rolls On, was released on February 12, 2021.

Early history
Both members of Florida Georgia Line first gained interest in music through church worship services. Brian Kelley, from Ormond Beach, Florida, was a star pitcher on his high school baseball team, leading to a scholarship at Florida State University; he later transferred to Belmont University after it became clear to him he would not succeed in the sport. He began learning to play guitar then began writing music inspired by Christian rock group Casting Crowns. Tyler Hubbard, a native of Monroe, Georgia, was a church worship leader who formed a hip hop group, Ingenious Circuit, in his teens. The two had a myriad of musical interests growing up: "Me and my friends drove trucks, listened to Garth Brooks, Alabama, Lil Wayne and Eminem," said Kelley.

The duo met at Belmont University in 2008 through a campus worship group, and following graduation, decided to give themselves two years to succeed as a country duo. They moved in together and began several odd jobs to pay bills, while playing clubs on the weekends. While independent, they recorded and digitally distributed their first EP, Anything Like Me (2010). They were discovered by Nickelback producer Joey Moi at a county fair, and the three began entering the studio together. Unlike typical country music sessions, the group spent days polishing songs, which were collected on the duo's second EP, It'z Just What We Do (2012). In terms of production, the band modeled their sound on bands such as Nickelback, Shinedown, and Three Days Grace, while Moi aimed for each song to resemble hair metal group Def Leppard in structure. Major labels became interested when the song "Cruise" first aired on satellite radio on The Highway channel and began selling well in the iTunes Store, leading to a deal with Republic Nashville and Big Machine Label Group.

Kelley likes to think of his career not as a career, but as a lifestyle. "Country music is always evolving and will continue to evolve," he told Forbes magazine.

Musical career

2010: Anything Like Me
Florida Georgia Line's first EP, released on December 14, 2010, is a six-song EP produced with Wesley Walker. All of the songs were written by either Hubbard or Hubbard and Kelley. The EP consists of the songs "You're Country", "Now That She's Gone", "Man I Am Today", "Never Let Her Go" (co-written with "Cruise" co-writer Chase Rice), "Black Tears", and "Backwoods Beauty Queen". The song "Black Tears" was also on Jason Aldean's 2012 album Night Train.

2012–2013: It'z Just What We Do and Here's to the Good Times
The duo's second EP is a five-song EP produced by Joey Moi on Big Loud Mountain Records and released on May 15, 2012. It starts off with "Cruise" and also includes "Get Your Shine On", "Tip It Back", "Tell Me How You Like It", and the title track "It'z Just What We Do".

The duo's first studio album, Here's to the Good Times, was an 11-song album produced by Joey Moi on Republic Nashville and released on December 4, 2012. The pair's first full-length, Here's to the Good Times, was the sixth-best-selling album of 2013 (topping Drake and Katy Perry, among others). "Cruise", the first single, reached number one on the Country Airplay chart dated December 15, 2012. A remix of "Cruise" featuring Nelly later hit number four on the US Billboard Hot 100. Florida Georgia Line's signature hit, "Cruise", holds one major record to date: the best-selling country digital song of all time, with sales surpassing 10 million. The song spent a record 24 weeks at number one on Billboards Hot Country Songs chart, which was the longest reign in the history of the chart until July 2017 when it was surpassed by Sam Hunt's "Body Like a Back Road".

The album's second single, "Get Your Shine On", was released to country radio on January 21, 2013, and reached number one on the Country Airplay chart in May 2013. It was co-written by the duo along with Rodney Clawson and Chris Tompkins. "Round Here" was released as the album's third single on June 3, 2013, and reached number one on the Country Airplay chart in September 2013. The album's fourth single, "Stay", was released to country radio on October 7, 2013. It was co-written and originally recorded by Black Stone Cherry. It reached number one on the Hot Country Songs chart and the Country Airplay chart in December 2013.

A deluxe edition of Here's to the Good Times titled Here's to the Good Times... This Is How We Roll was released on November 25, 2013. A music video for "It'z Just What We Do" premiered on December 13, 2013, with the video being uploaded to YouTube on December 26, 2013. "This Is How We Roll", a collaboration with Luke Bryan, was released from the deluxe edition as the album's fifth and final single on February 10, 2014, and reached number one on the Hot Country Songs chart in March 2014.

Florida Georgia Line toured the United States as part of the Dirt Road Diaries Tour with Thompson Square and headlining act Luke Bryan. In June 2013, the album reached number one on the Billboard Top Country Albums chart. It stayed at the top spot for ten weeks.

2014–2017: Anything Goes and Dig Your Roots
The duo revealed on August 15, 2014, that their second studio album would be titled Anything Goes with a release date of October 14, 2014. The album's first single, "Dirt", was released to country radio and digital sales outlets on July 8, 2014, and became the sixth consecutive single by Florida Georgia Line to make the top five on the Billboard Hot Country Songs chart. "Sun Daze" was released to digital sales outlets on September 16, 2014. A week later, the album's title track, "Anything Goes", was released on September 22, 2014. Florida Georgia Line also appeared on the Hot Tours recap. "Confession" was released to country radio on November 3, 2015 as the album's final single, and reached number one on the Country Airplay chart in April 2016.

In 2016, Florida Georgia Line became the first and only country artist to receive the Digital Diamond Award, for their single "Cruise" crossing the 10× Platinum threshold.

The duo released their third studio album Dig Your Roots on August 29, 2016, featuring Tim McGraw, Ziggy Marley, and the Backstreet Boys and started their Dig Your Roots tour, with Ryan Follesé, Chris Lane, and Dustin Lynch. They collaborated with Bebe Rexha on the song "Meant to Be" for her EP, All Your Fault: Pt. 2. Along with Hank Williams Jr. and Jason Derulo, Florida Georgia Line sang "All My Rowdy Friends Are Here on Monday Night" for ESPN's Monday Night Football NFL broadcasts in 2017.

2018–2022: Can't Say I Ain't Country, Life Rolls On, and Greatest Hits
The duo released "Simple" to country radio on June 1, 2018. Since then, they have released the preview tracks "Colorado," "Talk You Out of It," and "Sittin Pretty." "Talk You Out of It" was announced as the second single from the album, and was released to country radio on November 5, 2018. On December 11, 2018, the duo announced their fourth studio album, Can't Say I Ain't Country, which was released on February 15, 2019. On September 30, 2019, they won the Breakout Artist of the Decade award, along with Single of the Decade for their Diamond-certified 2012 hit “Cruise,” and Music Event of the Decade for "Meant to Be", their 2017 collaboration with Bebe Rexha. On September 23, 2019, Blessings was released as the third single to country radio. On February 19, 2020, the duo featured on the country remix of Canadian singer Justin Bieber's January 2020 single, "Yummy". The original song is the lead single of Bieber's fifth studio album, Changes, released five days before the remix.

On March 27, 2020, the duo released "I Love My Country", the debut single off their upcoming fifth album. The duo appeared on NBC's Songland where they premiered the track "Second Guessing". On May 22, 2020, they released the 6-Pack EP. In June 2020, they were featured on Christian music singer Chris Tomlin's "Thank You Lord" with Thomas Rhett. The track was part of Tomlin's collaboration album Chris Tomlin & Friends, which included "Forever Home", another track they were featured on. Both members of the duo were co-executive producers of the album and co-writers on many of the tracks. In September 2020, the duo released the single "Long Live". They then released  the single "Lil Bit", a collaboration with Nelly from his upcoming country-influenced album Heartland, a project the duo are co-executive producers on. They were also featured on long-time friend Chase Rice's single "Drinkin' Beer. Talkin' God. Amen.". In December 2020, they announced their fifth studio album Life Rolls On, which was released on February 12, 2021, and includes "Long Live", as well as all six songs from the 6-Pack EP.

In February 2022, Hubbard and Kelley announced that they would be "taking a break" from recording music together and would be on an indefinite hiatus from touring. On October 14, a greatest hits album, entitled Greatest Hits,  was announced via Big Machine Label Group's Instagram account, to be released November 9.

Philanthropy and impact 
Brian and Tyler have participated in a number of philanthropic endeavors, but mostly focus on feeding the hungry. In 2014, the band was the face of the General Mills "Outnumber Hunger" campaign, which raised $1.2M for Feeding America.

"Through our experiences with Outnumber Hunger, we have learned the far reach of hunger in America, affecting people from all different backgrounds," said Tyler Hubbard, the Georgia half of Florida Georgia Line. "This year, we're proud to take an even bigger role in the fight against hunger and rally the nation to help those in need."

Controversy 
In July 2016, Florida Georgia Line came under fire when they banned law enforcement from being backstage during a concert in Kenosha, Wisconsin. Kenosha County Sheriff David Beth said he never found out why the band's agent made this request.  Following the incident, Brian Kelley called Kenosha County sheriff David Beth and apologized, calling it a misunderstanding. The duo issued an apology.

Personal lives
On December 16, 2013, Kelley married his girlfriend of seven months, Brittney Marie Cole. In 2014, Kelley appeared on Animal Planet's Treehouse Masters.

In February 2014, Hubbard sustained a back injury in a dirt bike accident. On July 1, 2015, Hubbard married his longtime girlfriend Hayley Stommel. The couple have three children together: daughter Olivia Rose Hubbard (born December 2017), and sons Luca Reed Hubbard (born August 19, 2019) and Atlas Roy Hubbard (born September 24, 2020).

In 2015, Forbes estimated that Florida Georgia Line's annual income was $36.5 million, split evenly between both men.

Discography 

Studio albums
 Here's to the Good Times (2012)
 Anything Goes (2014)
 Dig Your Roots (2016)
 Can't Say I Ain't Country (2019)
 Life Rolls On (2021)

Tours
Headlining
 Here's to the Good Times Tour (2013–2014)
 Anything Goes Tour (2015)
 Dig Your Roots Tour (2016)
 Smooth Tour (2017)
 Can't Say I Ain't Country Tour (2019)

Supporting
 The Summer Never Ends Tour (2012) with Jake Owen
 Dirt Road Diaries Tour (2013) with Luke Bryan
 The Red Tour (2013) with Taylor Swift 
 Burn It Down Tour (2014) with Jason Aldean
 Kick the Dust Up Tour (2015) with Luke Bryan 
 Chillaxification Tour (2020) with Kenny Chesney

Awards and nominations

Businesses 
Florida Georgia Line has taken advantage of their musical career success and used it to open other businesses that have been successful partially because of the popularity in the country music community. They have used their music to promote their own brand of whiskey “Old Camp Whiskey” in their song Smooth and their feature on Morgan Wallen's single Up Down. The duo also has a restaurant named FGL House in Nashville, TN, as well as a new creative compound in Nashville, that is home to three businesses. The three business are meet + greet, Tree Vibez Music (which is a publishing company launched by Kelley and Hubbard in 2015), and Tribe Kelley Trading Post (which is a business started by Brian Kelley and his wife.) The two men launched Round Here Records in 2019; an independent label with Canaan Smith signed as the flagship artist.

Television appearances

Notes

References

External links

 

2010 establishments in Tennessee
Country music groups from Tennessee
American musical duos
Country pop duos
Musical groups established in 2010
Musical groups from Nashville, Tennessee
Republic Records artists
Male musical duos